Leon McSweeney (born 19 February 1983) is an Irish former footballer who made more than 200 appearances in the Football League. McSweeney now serves as the U18-U23 Player Liaison Officer at former club Leicester City.

Ireland
Leon McSweeney began his career with hometown club Cork City F.C. McSweeney's prolific form in Ireland whilst under the watchful eye of then manager Colin Murphy earned him a move Leicester City in 2001, signing a 3-year professional contract whilst still a teenager.

England

Leicester City 
Despite playing regularly for the Reserves, McSweeney failed to make a first-team appearance and in 2003 was released by then manager Mickey Adams. He soon signed a contract with Scarborough under the management of Russell Slade, where he made four appearances, before accepting a place at Loughborough University.

University/Non-League
McSweeney enjoyed success representing the University football club, helping them win the British University Sports Association (BUSA) championship in 2005 and 2006. McSweeney was subsequently selected to represent the English University Football Team at the British University Games in 2007, helping the team win the gold medal.

In tandem with this, McSweeney tasted success at a number of non-league clubs starting at Hucknall Town, where he spent half a season, under then manager Steve Burr, helping them win what was then the Northern Premier League title and achieve promotion to the Football Conference. The club declined their place in the higher league, however, and in the summer of 2004 McSweeney moved to Hednesford Town. He had a successful season with The Pitmen, scoring 15 goals and helping them gain promotion to the Conference North. He could not agree a new contract with the club, however, and so moved back to Hucknall Town in the summer of 2005, only to return to Hednesford Town again in December only to fail to save the club from relegation. The following summer McSweeney moved to Ilkeston Town under the guidance of former Nottingham Forest and Sheffield Wednesday striker Nigel Jemson. He spent one season there, scoring 12 goals. He graduated from Loughborough University in 2007 where he achieved a degree in Geography with Sport and Leisure Management.

Return to Ireland

Cork City
McSweeney moved back to his hometown club, Cork City F.C., in the League of Ireland in the summer of 2007, where he worked under well renowned Irish manager Damien Richardson . He made his debut in the League Cup Quarter-Final away to Bohemians . He was an instant success at Turners Cross, playing predominantly as a right winger and played a key role in the club's successful 2007 FAI Cup campaign culminating in a 1–0 victory over Longford Town FC. At the end of the Irish 2007 season McSweeney was voted Cork City's "signing of the season" by an online poll at corkcity.ie, but contract talks stalled due to the infamous 'Arkaga' takeover and, despite interest from Bohemians, he crossed the Irish Sea again, signing an 18-month contract with Stockport County under the management of fellow Irishman Jim Gannon .

Back to England

Stockport County
Success followed McSweeney to Edgeley Park, and at the end of the 2007–2008 season he played his part in helping 'The Hatters' gain promotion via the playoffs at the new Wembley Stadium, where they beat Rochdale  3–2 in a pulsating encounter in front of almost 40,000 spectators. McSweeney continued his fine form in Stockport's League 1 campaign in 2008/09 with some eye catching performances in his new role as right back, and the Hatters style of football under Gannon allowed McSweeney become a crowd favourite, as he weighed in with 5 goals and 8 assists in all competitions. He went on to make almost 50 appearances for the Cheshire side before administration forced the club to cut costs in the summer of 2009.

Hartlepool United
McSweeney was then snapped up by Hartlepool United in May 2009 by Hartlepool's then Director of Sport Chris Turner. He went on to make over 70 appearances for "the Monkey Hangers" playing as both a right back and a winger scoring 4 goals and 17 assists in all competitions. In May 2011 he was not offered a new contract by the club, along with nine other players from the 2010–11 squad.

Leyton Orient
On 16 June 2011, McSweeney signed for Leyton Orient, where he worked for a second time under Russell Slade. He signed a two-year contract. After a slow start to his Orient career due to injury caused in his debut game away at Walsall, McSweeney soon established himself as first choice right back. His adaptability proved a useful tool with Slade using McSweeney in both midfield and often as an accomplished left back to fill the club's problem position. After 73 appearances in all competitions, and with the team finishing three points outside the playoffs in 7th, McSweeney was released by Orient on 30 April 2013.

Carlisle United
Having not won in their opening six games of the 2013/2014 season, Carlisle United manager Greg Abbott took McSweeney north to Cumbria signing a four-month deal with Carlisle United on 4 September 2013. Abbott was dismissed as manager after McSweeney's first game, a 1-0 home defeat to Port Vale resulting in Graham Kavanagh becoming caretaker manager. McSweeney played a key role in the oncoming fixtures helping the team secure consecutive wins against Sheffield United, Notts County and Stevenage. As a result of this upturn in club fortunes Graham Kavanagh was appointed full-time manager. McSweeney went on to start 10 games for the Cumbrians, winning 6 and drawing 2, but was informed that his short term deal would not be extended beyond January as a result of budget overspending.

Northampton Town
McSweeney became one of new manager, Chris Wilder, first signings as manager of Northampton Town, signing him on a contract until the end of the 2013–14 season on 30 January 2014, with the team seven points adrift at the foot of the League two table. McSweeney instantly slotted in at right back for the struggling 'Cobblers' and went on to make 18 appearances in the remaining 20 games helping the team secure safety in the division on the last day of the season with victory over Oxford. A detailed account of Northampton's relegation battle, "Cobblers and the Great Escape", can be found at McSweeney's personal blog http://sweeneymc83blog.wordpress.com. Despite the club's survival, McSweeney was not offered a renewed contract and was released at the end of the 2014 season along with eight others

Honours
Hucknall Town
•  Northern Premier League Winner (now Conference North): 2004

Hednesford Town
• Southern Premier League Play-Off Winner: 2005

Cork City
• FAI Cup Winner: 2007

Stockport County
• League 2 Play-Off Winner: 2008

References

External links

1983 births
Living people
Sportspeople from Cork (city)
Association football midfielders
Association football forwards
Republic of Ireland association footballers
Cork City F.C. players
Leicester City F.C. players
Hednesford Town F.C. players
Hucknall Town F.C. players
Ilkeston Town F.C. (1945) players
Stockport County F.C. players
Hartlepool United F.C. players
Leyton Orient F.C. players
Carlisle United F.C. players
Northampton Town F.C. players
League of Ireland players
English Football League players
Loughborough University F.C. players